The 1580s decade ran from January 1, 1580, to December 31, 1589.

References